Xylella fastidiosa is an aerobic, Gram-negative bacterium of the genus Xylella. It is a plant pathogen, that grows in the water transport tissues of plants (xylem vessels) and is transmitted exclusively by xylem sap-feeding insects such as sharpshooters and spittlebugs.  Many plant diseases are due to infections of X. fastidiosa, including bacterial leaf scorch, oleander leaf scorch, coffee leaf scorch (CLS), alfalfa dwarf, phony peach disease, and the economically important Pierce's disease of grapes (PD), olive quick decline syndrome (OQDS), and citrus variegated chlorosis (CVC). While the largest outbreaks of X. fastidiosa–related diseases have occurred in the Americas and Europe, this pathogen has also been found in Taiwan, Israel, and a few other countries worldwide.

Xylella fastidiosa can infect an extremely wide range of plants, many of which do not show any symptoms of disease. Disease occurs in plant species that are susceptible due to blockage of water flow in the xylem vessels caused by several factors: bacterial obstruction, overreaction of the plant immune response (tylose formation), and formation of air embolisms. A strain of X. fastidiosa responsible for citrus variegated chlorosis was the first bacterial plant pathogen to have its genome sequenced, in part because of its importance in agriculture. Due to the significant impacts of this pathogen on agricultural crops around the world there is substantial investment in scientific research related to X. fastidiosa and the diseases it causes.

Pathogen anatomy and disease cycle 
Xylella fastidiosa is rod-shaped, and at least one subspecies has two types of pili on only one pole; longer, type IV pili are used for locomotion, while shorter, type I pili assist in biofilm formation inside their hosts.  As demonstrated using a PD-related strain, the bacterium has a characteristic twitching motion that enables groups of bacteria to travel upstream against heavy flow, such as that found in xylem vessels.  It is obligately insect-vector transmitted from xylem-feeding insects directly into xylem, but infected plant material for vegetative propagation (e.g. grafting) can produce mature plants that also have an X. fastidiosa disease.  In the wild, infections tend to occur during warmer seasons, when insect vector populations peak. The bacterium is not seed transmitted, but instead is transmitted through "xylem feed-ing, suctorial homopteran insects such as sharpshooter leafhoppers and spittle bugs" and has been historically difficult to culture (fastidious), as its specific epithet, fastidiosa, reflects.

X. fastidiosa can be divided into four subspecies that affect different plants and have separate origins.  is the most studied subspecies, as it is the causal agent of PD; it is thought to have originated in southern Central America, and also affects other species of plants. X. f. multiplex affects many trees, including stone-fruit ones such as peaches and plums, and is thought to originate in temperate and southern North America. X. f. pauca is believed to have originated in South America. It is the causal agent of citrus variegated chlorosis (CVC) in Brazil and also affects South American coffee crops, causing coffee leaf scorch. X. f. sandyi is thought to have originated in the southern part of the United States, and is notable for causing oleander leaf scorch.

X. fastidiosa has a two-part lifecycle, which occurs inside an insect vector and inside a susceptible plant.  While the bacterium has been found across the globe, only once the bacterium reaches systemic levels do symptoms present themselves. Once established in a new region, X. fastidosa spread is dependent on the obligate transmission by xylem-sap feeding insect. Within susceptible plant hosts, X. fastidiosa forms a biofilm-like layer within xylem cells and tracheary elements that can completely block the water transport in affected vessels.

Strains 
 is a nonpathogenic strain of X.f. which is used as a biocontrol of its relatives. (Really it is dramatically less pathogenic. It does colonize grape vines but rarely and less severely.) Zhang et al., 2011 finds very little genomic distance between pathogenic and EB92-1 strains.

Symptoms 
Significant variation in symptoms is seen between diseases, though some symptoms are expressed across species. On a macroscopic scale, plants infected with a X. fastidiosa-related disease exhibit symptoms of water, zinc, and iron deficiencies, manifesting as leaf scorching and stunting in leaves turning them yellowish-brown, gummy substance around leaves, fruit reduction in size and quality, and overall plant height.  As the bacterium progressively colonizes xylem tissues, affected plants often block off their xylem tissue, which can limit the spread of this pathogen; blocking can occur in the form of polysaccharide-rich gels, tyloses, or both.  These plant defenses do not seem to hinder the movement of X. fastidiosa. Occlusion of vascular tissue, while a normal plant response to infection, makes symptoms significantly worse; as the bacterium itself also reduces vascular function, a 90% reduction of vascular hydraulic function was seen in susceptible Vitis vinifera.  This bacterium rarely completely blocks vascular tissue. There usually is a slight amount of vascular function that keeps the plant alive, but makes its fruit or branches die, making the specific plant economically nonproductive. This can cause a massive drop on supply of quality fruit. Smaller colonies usually occur throughout a high proportion of xylem vessels of a symptomatic plant.

X. fastidiosa is a Gram-negative, xylem-limited illness that is spread by insects. It can damage a variety of broadleaved tree species that are commonly grown in the United States. X. Fastidiosa can be found in about 600 different plant species.
 Withering and desiccation of branches
 Leaf chlorosis
 Dwarfing or lack of growth of the plant
 Drooping appearance and shorter internodes
 Shriveled fruits on infected plants
 Premature fruit abscission
 gum-like substance on leave
 hardening and size reduction of fruit

Pierce's disease 
Severe PD symptoms include shriveled fruit, leaf scorching, and premature abscission of leaves, with bare petioles remaining on stems.

Citrus variegated chlorosis 
This disease is named after the characteristic spotty chlorosis on upper sides of citrus leaves. Fruits of infected plants are small and hard.

Leaf scorches 
In coffee, premature abscission of leaves and fruits is of bigger concern than scorching.

Environment 
X. fastidiosa occurs worldwide, though its diseases are most prominent in riparian habitats including the southeastern United States, California, and South America.

Symptoms of X. fastidiosa diseases worsen during hot, dry periods in the summer; lack of water and maximum demand from a full canopy of leaves, combined with symptoms due to disease, stress infected plants to a breaking point. Cold winters can limit the spread of the disease, as it occurs in California, but not in regions with milder winters such as Brazil. Additionally, dry summers seem to delay symptom development of PD in California.

Any conditions that increase vector populations can increase disease incidence, such as seasonal rainfall and forests or tree cover adjacent to crops, which serve as alternate food sources and overwintering locations for leafhoppers.

Alexander Purcell, an expert on X. fastidiosa, hypothesized that plants foreign to X. fastidiosas area of origin, the neotropical regions, are more susceptible to symptom development. Thus, plants from warmer climates are more resistant to X. fastidiosa disease development, while plants from areas with harsher winters, such as grapes, are more severely affected by this disease.

Host species
X. fastidiosa has a very wide host range; as of 2020, its known host range was 595 plant species, with 343 species confirmed by two different detection methods, in 85 botanical families.  Most X. fastidiosa host plants are dicots, but it has also been reported in monocots and ginkgo, a gymnosperm.  However, the vast majority of host plants remain asymptomatic, making them reservoirs for infection.

Due to the temperate climates of South America and the southeastern  and west coast of the United States, X. fastidiosa can be a limiting factor in fruit crop production, particularly for stone fruits in northern Florida and grapes in California.  In South America, X. fastidiosa can cause significant losses in the citrus and coffee industries; a third of today's citrus crops in Brazil has CVC symptoms.

X. fastidiosa also colonizes the foreguts of insect vectors, which can be any xylem-feeding insects, often sharpshooters in the Cicadellidae subfamily Cicadellinae.  After an insect acquires X. fastidiosa, it has a short latent period around 2 hours, then the bacterium is transmissible for a period of a few months or as long as the insect is alive.  The bacterium multiplies within its vectors, forming a "bacterial carpet" within the foregut of its host.  If the host sheds its foregut during molting, the vector is no longer infected, but can reacquire the pathogen.  At present, no evidence shows that the bacterium has any detrimental effect on its insect hosts.

Oleander 
Oleander leaf scorch is a disease of landscape oleanders (Nerium oleander) caused by a X. fastidiosa strain that has become prevalent in California and Arizona, starting in the mid-1990s. This disease is transmitted by a type of leafhopper (insect) called the glassy-winged sharpshooter (Homalodisca coagulata).   Oleander is commonly used in decorative landscaping in California, so the plants serve as widely distributed reservoirs for Xylella.

Both almond and oleander plants in the Italian region of Apulia have also tested positive for the pathogen.

Grape vines 
Pierce's disease (PD) was discovered in 1892 by Newton B. Pierce (1856–1916; California's first professional plant pathologist) on grapes in California near Anaheim, where it was known as "Anaheim disease". The disease is endemic in Northern California, being spread by the blue-green sharpshooter, which attacks only grapevines  adjacent to riparian habitats. It became a real threat to California's wine industry when the glassy-winged sharpshooter, native to the Southeast United States, was discovered in the Temecula Valley in California in 1996; it spreads PD much more extensively than other vectors.

Symptoms of infection on grape vines 
When a grape vine becomes infected, the bacterium causes a gel to form in the xylem tissue of the vine, preventing water from being drawn through the vine. Leaves on vines with Pierce's disease turn yellow and brown, and eventually drop off the vine. Shoots also die. After one to five years, the vine itself dies. The proximity of vineyards to citrus groves compounds the threat, because citrus is not only a host of sharpshooter eggs, but also is a popular overwintering site for this insect.

Collaborative efforts for solutions 
In a unique effort, growers, administrators, policy makers, and researchers are working on a solution for this immense X. fastidiosa threat. No cure has been found, but the understanding of X. fastidiosa and glassy-winged sharpshooter biology has markedly increased since 2000, when the California Department of Food and Agriculture, in collaboration with different universities, such as University of California, Davis; University of California, Berkeley; University of California, Riverside, and  University of Houston–Downtown started to focus their research on this pest. The research explores the different aspects of the disease propagation from the vector to the host plant and within the host plant, to the impact of the disease on California's economy. All researchers working on Pierce's disease meet annually in San Diego in mid-December to discuss the progress in their field. All proceedings from this symposium can be found on the Pierce's disease website, developed and managed by the Public Intellectual Property Resource for Agriculture (PIPRA).

Few resistant Vitis vinifera varieties are known, and Chardonnay and Pinot noir are especially susceptible, but muscadine grapes (V. rotundifolia) have a natural resistance. Pierce's disease is found in the Southeastern United States and Mexico. Also, it was reported by Luis G. Jiménez-Arias in Costa Rica, and Venezuela, and possibly in other parts of Central and South America. In 2010, X. fastidosa became apparent in Europe, posing a serious, real threat. There are isolated hot spots of the disease near creeks in Napa and Sonoma in Northern California.
Work is underway at UC Davis to breed PD resistance from V. rotundifolia into V. vinifera. The first generation was 50% high-quality V. vinifera genes, the next 75%, the third 87% and the fourth 94%. In the spring of 2007, seedlings that are 94% V. vinifera were planted.

A resistant variety, 'Victoria Red', was released for use especially in Coastal Texas.

Olive trees 

In October 2013, the bacterium was found infecting olive trees in the region of Apulia in southern Italy. The disease caused rapid decline in olive grove yields, and by April 2015, was affecting the whole Province of Lecce and other zones of Apulia,
though it had not previously been confirmed in Europe. The subspecies involved in Italy is X. f. pauca, which shows a marked preference for olive trees and warm conditions and is thought to be unlikely to spread to Northern Europe.

The cycle in olives has been called olive quick decline syndrome (in ). The disease causes withering and desiccation of terminal shoots, distributed randomly at first but then expanding to the rest of the canopy resulting in the collapse and death of trees. In affected groves, all plants normally show symptoms. The most severely affected olives are the century-old trees of local cultivars Cellina di Nardò and Ogliarola salentina.

By 2015, the disease had infected up to a million olive trees in Apulia  and Xylella fastidiosa had reached Corsica, By October 2015, it had reached Mainland France, near Nice, in Provence-Alpes-Côte d'Azur, affecting the non-native myrtle-leaf milkwort (Polygala myrtifolia). This is the subspecies X. fastidiosa subsp. multiplex which is considered to be a different genetic variant of the bacterium to that found in Italy. On 18 August 2016 in Corsica, 279 foci of the infection have been detected, concentrated mostly in the south and the west of the island. In August 2016, the bacterium was detected in Germany in an oleander plant. In January 2017 it was detected in Mallorca and Ibiza.

Notably, in 2016, olive leaf scorch was first detected in X. fastidiosas native range, in Brazil.

In June 2017, it was detected in the Iberian peninsula, specifically in Guadalest, Alicante. In 2018, it was detected in Spain  and Portugal, and in Israel in 2019.

Citrus 
Xylella infection was detected in South American citrus in the 1980's and subsequently in the USA but had limited spread beyond the America's until the detection in citrus groves in Portugal in 2023.

Genome sequencing 
The genome of X. fastidiosa was sequenced  by a pool of over 30 research laboratories in the state of São Paulo, Brazil, funded by the São Paulo Research Foundation.

In popular culture 
Two episodes of the Canadian television show ReGenesis investigated X. fastidiosa, the cause of a massive loss in Florida orange groves.

See also 
 Bacterial leaf scorch
 Homalodisca vitripennis
 Philaenus spumarius

References

Further reading 

 
 
 CDFA PD/GWSS Board Website PD/GWSS Interactive Forum

External links

 Type strain of Xylella fastidiosa at BacDive -  the Bacterial Diversity Metadatabase
 
 

Bacteria described in 1987
Bacterial grape diseases
Bacterial citrus diseases
Bacterial plant pathogens and diseases
Xanthomonadales